Luvern Carl Fear (August 21, 1925 – September 6, 1976) was a pitcher in Major League Baseball. He played for the Chicago Cubs.

References

External links

1924 births
1976 deaths
Major League Baseball pitchers
Chicago Cubs players
Baseball players from Iowa
People from Clay County, Iowa